Helissio (1993–2013) was a Thoroughbred racehorse sired by Fairy King and a grandson of Northern Dancer. Owned by the Spanish businessman Enrique Sarasola, he was voted the European Horse of the Year for 1996

His career highlight was winning the 1996 running of the Prix de l'Arc de Triomphe at Longchamps by five lengths and earned a Timeform rating of 136.  He failed to reproduce that form the following year finishing 7¾ lengths behind the winner Peintre Celebre.

Retired after his four-year-old campaign, Helissio stood at stud at the Widden Stud in Australia and Shadai Stallion Station in Japan. He later stood at The National Stud in Newmarket, England, Larkinglass Farm and Park House Stud. He sired Helenus, a top class Australian three-year-old stayer; the brilliant Japanese horse Pop Rock; and Weekend Beauty, the dam of six-time Group One winner Weekend Hussler.

Helissio died of a heart attack at Scarvagh House Stud in Ireland on 8 October 2013.

Detailed information, including pedigree analysis and progeny performance, can be found at the Scarvagh Stud/Sandley Stud website.

References

 Helissio at The National Stud

1993 racehorse births
2013 racehorse deaths
Racehorses bred in Orne
Racehorses trained in France
Arc winners
Cartier Award winners
European Thoroughbred Horse of the Year
Thoroughbred family 10-c